The Sauer S 1800 UL is a four stroke aircraft engine designed for homebuilt and ultralight aircraft.

Design and development
The engine is based on the Volkswagen air-cooled engine. It is extensively modified for aircraft use and all the parts are custom made. The engine is derived from the certified engines produced by the same manufacturer and used in several motorgliders and small aircraft.

Applications
Alpi Pioneer 200

Specifications (variant)

See also
Sauer Engines

References

External links

S1800UL